Tananarive Priscilla Due (born January 5, 1966) is an American author and educator. Due won the American Book Award for her novel The Living Blood. She is also known as a film historian with expertise in Black horror. Due teaches a course at UCLA called "The Sunken Place: Racism, Survival and the Black Horror Aesthetic", which focuses on the Jordan Peele film Get Out.

Early life and education
Due was born in Tallahassee, Florida, the oldest of three daughters of civil rights activist Patricia Stephens Due and civil rights lawyer John D. Due Jr. Her mother named her after the French name for Antananarivo, the capital of Madagascar.

Due earned a B.S. in journalism from Northwestern University's Medill School of Journalism and an M.A. in English literature, with an emphasis on Nigerian literature, from the University of Leeds. At Northwestern, she lived in the Communications Residential College.

Career
Due was working as a journalist and columnist for the Miami Herald when she wrote her first novel, The Between, in 1995. This, like many of her subsequent books, was part of the supernatural
genre. Due also wrote The Black Rose, a historical novel about Madam C. J. Walker (based in part on research conducted by Alex Haley before his death) and Freedom in the Family, a non-fiction work about the civil rights struggle. She contributed to the humor novel Naked Came the Manatee, a mystery/thriller parody to which various Miami-area authors each contributed chapters. Due also authored the African Immortals novel series and the Tennyson Hardwick novels.

Due is a member of the affiliate faculty in the creative writing MFA program at Antioch University Los Angeles and is also an endowed Cosby chair in the humanities at Spelman College in Atlanta.

She developed a course at UCLA called "The Sunken Place: Racism, Survival And The Black Horror Aesthetic," after the release of the 2017 film Get Out.  The first course went viral and included a visit from Peele.

Due was featured in the 2019 documentary film Horror Noire: A History of Black Horror, produced by Shudder.

Personal life
Due is married to author Steven Barnes, whom she met in 1997 at a Clark Atlanta University panel on "The African-American Fantastic Imagination: Explorations in Science Fiction, Fantasy and Horror". The couple lives in the Los Angeles, California area with their son, Jason.

Bibliography

Novels

Speculative fiction
 The Between (1995)
 The Good House (2003)
 Joplin's Ghost (2005)
 Ghost Summer: Stories (2015)

African Immortals series
 My Soul to Keep (1997)
 The Living Blood (2001)
 Blood Colony (2008)
 My Soul To Take (2011)

Mysteries
 Naked Came the Manatee (1996) (contributor)

The Tennyson Hardwick novels
 Casanegra (2007; with Blair Underwood and Steven Barnes)
 In the Night of the Heat (2008; with Blair Underwood and Steven Barnes)
 From Cape Town with Love (2010; with Blair Underwood and Steven Barnes)
 South by Southeast (2012; with Blair Underwood and Steven Barnes)

Short stories
 "Like Daughter", Dark Matter: A Century of Speculative Fiction from the African Diaspora (2000)
 "Trial Day", Mojo: Conjure Stories (2003)
 "Aftermoon", Dark Matter: Reading the Bones (2004)
 "Senora Suerte", The Magazine of Fantasy & Science Fiction (2006)
 "The Lake" (2011)
 "Enhancement", Whose Future is It? (2018)
"The Wishing Pool" (2021)

Other works
 The Black Rose, historical fiction about Madam C. J. Walker (2000)
  Freedom in the Family: A Mother-Daughter Memoir of the Fight for Civil Rights (2003) (with Patricia Stephens Due)
Devil's Wake (with Steven Barnes) (2012)
Domino Falls (2013)
Ghost Summer (Collection) (2015)

Awards and recognition
 Nominated for a Bram Stoker Award for Superior Achievement in a First Novel for The Between
 Nominated for a Bram Stoker Award for Best Novel for My Soul to Keep
 Nominated for an NAACP Image Award for The Black Rose
 Received the NAACP Image Award for In the Night of the Heat: A Tennyson Hardwick Novel (with Blair Underwood and Steven Barnes)
 The American Book Award for The Living Blood
 2008 Carl Brandon Kindred Award for the novella "Ghost Summer", which appeared in the anthology The Ancestors (2008)
 Winner of the 2016 British Fantasy Award for the short story collection Ghost Summer.
 Winner of the 2020 Ignyte Award for Best in Creative Nonfiction for Black Horror Rising, published in Uncanny Magazine (2019)
 Winner of the 2022 Ember Award "for unsung contributions to genre"

See also
 List of horror fiction authors

References

External links
 Official website
 
 Tananarive Due: 'My Soul to Keep'—Interview on NPR, All Things Considered, October 31, 1997 (Audio)

1966 births
Living people
20th-century American novelists
20th-century American short story writers
20th-century American women writers
21st-century American novelists
21st-century American short story writers
21st-century American women writers
African-American novelists
African-American short story writers
Afrofuturist writers
American horror writers
American science fiction writers
American women novelists
American women short story writers
Black speculative fiction authors
Medill School of Journalism alumni
People from Longview, Washington
The Magazine of Fantasy & Science Fiction people
Women horror writers
Women science fiction and fantasy writers
Writers from Tallahassee, Florida
American Book Award winners
Novelists from Florida
20th-century African-American women writers
20th-century African-American writers
21st-century African-American women writers
21st-century African-American writers